I Brigade, Royal Horse Artillery (Territorial Force), along with its sister II Brigade, Royal Horse Artillery (T.F.), was a horse artillery brigade of the Territorial Force that was formed in September 1914 for the 2nd Mounted Division at the start of World War I.

The brigade moved to Egypt with the division in April 1915 and remained there when the bulk of the division went to Gallipoli in August 1915.  It was once more part of the 2nd Mounted Division from December 1915 but was broken up in January 1916 when the division was dissolved.

History

Formation
A decision was made to form a new mounted division from the mounted brigades in and around the Churn area of Berkshire.  On 2 September 1914, 2nd Mounted Division, with Headquarters at Goring, came into being with three mounted brigades transferred from 1st Mounted Division (1st South Midland Mounted Brigade at Newbury, 2nd South Midland Mounted Brigade at Churn and the Nottinghamshire and Derbyshire Mounted Brigade at South Stoke) and the London Mounted Brigade at Streatley.  The brigades were relatively widely dispersed to allow an adequate water supply for the horses and to provide sufficient training areas.

Each of the four mounted brigades include a horse artillery battery of four Ehrhardt 15-pounder guns.  On 2 September 1914, I Brigade RHA (T.F.) was formed at Churn with Warwickshire Battery, RHA, late of the 1st South Midland Mounted Brigade.  On the same date, II Brigade RHA (T.F.) was also formed at Churn with Berkshire and Nottinghamshire Batteries, RHA and A and B Batteries, HAC.

Active service
On 1 November, Warwickshire Battery was posted to France: the first Territorial Force artillery battery to go on active service.  It was replaced in the brigade by B Battery, HAC from II Brigade, RHA (T.F.).

In November 1914, the division moved to Norfolk on coastal defence duties.  Artillery headquarters was established at Cromer, before joining the divisional headquarters at Hanworth in December, and the battery was at Gayton (1st South Midland Mounted Brigade was at King's Lynn).

In March 1915, the division was put on warning for overseas service.  In early April, the division starting leaving Avonmouth and the last elements landed at Alexandria before the end of the month.  By the middle of May, the horse artillery batteries were near Ismaïlia on Suez Canal Defences.  On 14 July 1915, B Battery, HAC (along with Berkshire, RHA of II Brigade) left for Aden.  They fought a sharp action at Sheikh Othman on 20 July, that removed the Turkish threat to Aden for the rest of the war, before returning to Egypt.

On 10 August 1915, the division was reorganized as a dismounted formation in preparation for service at Gallipoli.  Each Yeomanry Regiment left a squadron headquarters and two troops (about 100 officers and men) in Egypt to look after the horses.  The artillery batteries and ammunition columns, signal troops, mobile veterinary sections, Mounted Brigade Transport and Supply Columns and two of the Field Ambulances were also left behind in Egypt.

The 2nd Mounted Division returned from Gallipoli in December 1915 and was reformed and remounted.  On 13 December 1915, B Battery, HAC rejoined the brigade from Suez Canal Defences and on 20 December 1915, A Battery, HAC joined from II Brigade.  However, the dismemberment of the division began almost immediately as units were posted to the Western Frontier Force or to various other commands.  On 21 January 1916, A and B Batteries, HAC left to join the Suez Canal Defences and the brigade HQ was disbanded; 2nd Mounted Division was disbanded on the same day.

See also

Notes

References

Bibliography

External links
The Royal Horse Artillery on The Long, Long Trail
The Great War Royal Horse Artillery

Royal Horse Artillery brigades
Artillery units and formations of World War I
Military units and formations established in 1914
Military units and formations disestablished in 1916